New York State Court Officers (NYS Courts) are responsible for the safety and security and maintaining order within NYS court facilities statewide.

Training 

New York State Court Officers undergo comprehensive basic training at the NYS Court Officers Academy which was founded by Chief Thomas R. Hennessy (Ret.) The curriculum includes but is not limited to training in criminal and civil procedure law, constitutional law, police science, laws of arrest, use of force, firearms training, defensive tactics, arrest procedures and first aid/cpr/basic life support.

Power and authority 
New York State Court Officers are designated as New York State peace officers under ;
The powers of peace officers are listed and defined under criminal procedure law 2.20.

The powers of peace officers are limited by other sections or subdivisions of the criminal procedure law or penal law.

Vehicles 

New York State Court Officers currently utilize fully marked and unmarked, Ford Interceptors, Chevrolet Impalas, Dodge Chargers, Chevrolet Suburbans, and Chevrolet Expresses in their vehicle fleet.

Equipment 

New York State Court Officers are authorized to carry firearms on/off duty, expandable baton, handcuffs, flashlight, bullet resistant vest, pepper spray,  and a radio that is directly linked to other officers.

Rank structure 
From highest to lowest rank, the command structure is as follows:

Line of duty deaths

6 New York State Court Officers and 1 Court Clerk have died in the line of duty.

See also 

 United States Marshals Service#Court Security Officers
 List of law enforcement agencies in New York
 New York State Unified Court System

References

External links
 

New York (state) state courts
Specialist police departments of New York (state)
Court security